Guangxi cuisine is the cuisine of Guangxi, China. This cuisine ranges from the Guangdong like cuisine to Huang cuisine. The cuisine is fairly spicy. There is a difference between the city and the countryside cuisine.

Noodles are very popular in Guangxi, both rice and wheat.

Some examples of dishes include:

 Guilin rice noodles
 Beer fish
 Stuffed river snails
 Luosifen
 Taro Looped Meat

References